Mataya started shooting pool at age 11. Within a few years was playing exhibitions with Willie Mosconi. He then won three consecutive Michigan State Championships in 1966, 1967 and 1968. At 21, he won the 1971 Los Angeles 9-Ball Championship. Mataya won multiple titles in his career and in 1989 became a member of the Greater Lansing Area Sports Hall of Fame.

In 1982, Mataya wed Ewa Svensson, of Sweden (who was later inducted into Billiard Congress of America's Hall of Fame as Ewa Laurance in 2004), forming pool's first "power couple". Their daughter Nikki was born in 1985. Jimmy and Ewa later divorced.

Mataya enjoys other games of stake. In 1991, he was seen leaving Las Vegas in a brand-new Cadillac, courtesy of the Sahara Casino. In that same year Snap Magazine published an "...in-depth interview with Mataya, who offered many tips for young players and talked about his vision for the future of the sport."

Professional career
 1966 Lansing City 14.1 Championship
 1966 Michigan State 14.1 Championship
 1967 Lansing City 14.1 Championship
 1967 Michigan State 14.1 Championship
 1968 Lansing City 14.1 Championship
 1968 Michigan State 14.1 Championship
 1969 Michigan State 14.1 Championship
 1970 Michigan State 14.1 Championship
 1971 Los Angeles 9-Ball Championship 
 1971 Wheaton Open Straight Pool Tournament
 1972 Dayton Open All-Around Championship
 1972 Stardust Open 9-Ball Championship 
 1972 Stardust Open All-Around Championship 
 1973 Nevada State Championship
 1974 Michigan Open 9-Ball Championship
 1974 Nevada State Championship
 1976 Albuquerque 8-Ball Championship 
 1976 Albuquerque All-Around Championship
 1977 Dayton Open 8-Ball Championship
 1978 Pro-Celebrity 9-Ball Tournament 
 1978 Port Angeles Open 9-Ball
 1988 B.C. Open 9-Ball Pro-Am Doubles 
 1989 Greater Lansing Area Sports Hall of Fame

Filmography
When Mataya left the professional pool tournament trail, he was chosen to be a commentator for pool matches because of his knowledge of the game and his comedic style that entertains the audience.  "To add more color to an already colorful show, Mataya was selected as a co-commentator with Danny Diliberto at the 2004 Derby City Classic Nine-ball Ring Game in Louisville, Kentucky, the first ring game produced for broadcast.

Secrets of Pool Hustling (video, 1989), as himself
Pool the Master's Way (video, 1989), as himself, with Steve Mizerak and Ewa Mataya
The Color of Money (1986), as Julian's friend in the green room
The Baltimore Bullet (1980), as himself
Vega$: "The Usurper" Sept. 26, 1979, as himself

References

Mataya, Jimmy; Medina, Danny. The Hustle
King, Mason. "Three-Ring Circus", Billiards Digest, March 2004
"Ewa Mataya Laurance: BCA 2004 Hall of Fame Inductee", On the Break News, 2004

American pool players
Living people
Year of birth missing (living people)